Hetin (or ;  or ) is a village in Serbia. It is situated in the Žitište municipality, in the Central Banat District, Vojvodina province. The village has a Hungarian ethnic majority (53.21%) and its population numbering 763 people (2002 census).

Geography

The village is located near the border between Serbia and Romania. Closest neighbouring places are Srpski Itebej, Radojevo, Srpska Crnja, Vojvoda Stepa, Nova Crnja, Velike Livade, and Banatsko Karađorđevo. The postal code of the village is 23235, and the phone area code is 023 (telephone numbers in the village start with 832-).

History

Hetin was founded in 1841 by tobacco cultivators. In 1897, Hetin (Hetény) and Tamašfalva (Tamásfalva) were merged into one single village.

Demographics

Ethnic groups in the village include (2002 census):
 406 (53.21%) Hungarians
 306 (40.11%) Serbs
 others.

Historical population

1961: 2,008
1971: 1,604
1981: 1,139
1991: 881
2002: 763

Genealogical Records

Up to 1860, filial parish of Cărpiniș.
After 1860 filial parish of Nemačka Crnja (Srpska Crnja).
Separate RC church books only starting 1899 (today at Zrenjanin Parish).

See also
List of places in Serbia
List of cities, towns and villages in Vojvodina

References
Slobodan Ćurčić, Broj stanovnika Vojvodine, Novi Sad, 1996.

Populated places in Serbian Banat